Merismopedia (from the Greek merismos [division] and the Greek pedion [plain]) is a genus of cyanobacteria found in fresh and salt water. It is ovoid or spherical in shape and arranged in rows and flats, forming rectangular colonies held together by a mucilaginous matrix. Species in this genus divide in only two directions, creating a characteristic grid-like pattern.

References

External links
 NCBI Taxonomy: Merismopedia
 

Synechococcales
Cyanobacteria genera
Bacteria genera